The Decoy is a 1916 silent film crime drama directed by George Lederer and distributed by Mutual Film Company.

Re-releases
The film was rereleased in 1920 by C. B. Price under State Rights basis. In 1922 an independent company, Signet Film, rereleased the film under the title The Faithless Sex with Henry J. Napier listed as the director.

Cast
Frances Nelson - Glory Moore
Gladden James - Harvey Dix
Leonore Harris - Mrs. Lawrence
Robert Frazer - Jim Danvers
Frank Beamish - Milt Bannon
Lois Wilson -

Preservation status
This film survives in the Library of Congress collection and the BFI National Archive.

References

External links
 The Decoy at IMDb.com

1916 films
American silent feature films
American black-and-white films
Mutual Film films
American crime drama films
1916 crime drama films
1910s American films
Silent American drama films